Josué Fonseca Aponte (better known as Jay Fonseca) is a Puerto Rican journalist, radio host, lawyer, and political analyst. Fonseca appeared in Día a Día and Telenoticias on Telemundo Puerto Rico for eleven years until he announced his departure from the channel on 16 July 2021. Fonseca holds a bachelor's degree in Finance and Accounting from the University of Puerto Rico at Mayagüez (2006) and a juris doctor (cum laude) from the University of Puerto Rico School of Law (2011). From 2018 till his departure from Telemundo in 2021, he was the host of his own investigative reporting program, "Jay y sus rayos x," which will continue to be broadcast under "Rayos X".

Family 

Fonseca is the son of Víctor Fonseca and Teresa Aponte.

References

 Peter Muller exige la salida de Jay Fonseca de Telemundo

External links
 Official Facebook Page
 Official Twitter account

1982 births
Living people
People from San Lorenzo, Puerto Rico
Puerto Rican journalists
Puerto Rican lawyers
Puerto Rican political journalists
Puerto Rican radio personalities
Puerto Rican television personalities
University of Puerto Rico alumni